Jeanne Chevallier, spouse Jeanne Poulet, having taken from 1930 on the pseudonym Jane Evrard, (5 February 1893 – 4 November 1984), was a French musician. In 1930, she became the first woman conductor in France.

Life 
Born in Neuilly-Plaisance, she started playing the violin at the age of seven. She was admitted to the Conservatoire de Paris, in the violin class conducted by M. Lefort. She married the violinist Gaston Poulet in 1912. In 1913, they were commissioned by Pierre Monteux to take care of the Sacre du Printemps by Nijinsky. During the 1920s, when Gaston Poulet founded the Concerts Poulet, his wife was a violin teacher; they eventually split up.

She then called herself "Jane Evrard" and was the first French woman to become a conductor. In the daily Excelsior, Émile Vuillermoz wrote  Her concert toured in France, Portugal, Spain and the Netherlands.

At the end of her life, after being evicted from her apartment, she lived in a retirement home of the Rossini Foundation.

She died in Paris at age 91.

Sources 
 Website of Jane Evrard's grandson

See also

References

External links 

 Gaston Poulet Jane Evrard CD NEW (MALIBRAN MUSIC) on Ebay
 Burial place of Jane Evrard

1893 births
1984 deaths
Conservatoire de Paris alumni
French conductors (music)
Women conductors (music)
20th-century French women classical violinists